The canton of La Haute-Bigorre is an administrative division of the Hautes-Pyrénées department, southwestern France. It was created at the French canton reorganisation which came into effect in March 2015. Its seat is in Bagnères-de-Bigorre.

It consists of the following communes:
 
Antist
Asté
Astugue
Bagnères-de-Bigorre
Beaudéan
Campan
Gerde
Hiis
Labassère
Montgaillard
Neuilh
Ordizan
Pouzac
Trébons

References

Cantons of Hautes-Pyrénées